Freebrough Academy is a coeducational secondary school and sixth form located in Brotton, North Yorkshire, England.

Previously known as Warsett School, it later was renamed Freebrough Specialist Engineering College. The school converted to academy status in September 2010 and was renamed Freebrough Academy. The school is sponsored by the Northern Education Trust.

Freebrough Academy offers GCSEs, BTECs, OCR Nationals and NVQs as programmes of study for pupils, while students in the sixth form have the option to study from a range of A-levels and further BTECs. The school also has specialisms in engineering and business and enterprise.

References

External links
Freebrough Academy official website 

Secondary schools in Redcar and Cleveland
Academies in Redcar and Cleveland
Teesside University
Northern Education Trust schools

Specialist business and enterprise colleges
Specialist engineering colleges in England